Phrontis tiarula, common name the western mud nassa, is a species of  small sea snail with gills and an operculum, a marine gastropod mollusc in the family Nassariidae, the nassa mud snails or dog whelks.

Description
The length of the shell varies between 9 mm and 20 mm.

Distribution
This species occurs in the Pacific Ocean from California to Mexico.

Feeding habits 
These snails are exclusively scavengers.

References

 Dautzenberg, Ph. (1929). Contribution à l'étude de la faune de Madagascar: Mollusca marina testacea. Faune des colonies françaises, III(fasc. 4). Société d'Editions géographiques, maritimes et coloniales: Paris. 321-636, plates IV-VII pp.
 Cernohorsky W. O. (1984). Systematics of the family Nassariidae (Mollusca: Gastropoda). Bulletin of the Auckland Institute and Museum 14: 1-356.
 Turgeon, D.; Quinn, J.F.; Bogan, A.E.; Coan, E.V.; Hochberg, F.G.; Lyons, W.G.; Mikkelsen, P.M.; Neves, R.J.; Roper, C.F.E.; Rosenberg, G.; Roth, B.; Scheltema, A.; Thompson, F.G.; Vecchione, M.; Williams, J.D. (1998). Common and scientific names of aquatic invertebrates from the United States and Canada: mollusks. 2nd ed. American Fisheries Society Special Publication, 26. American Fisheries Society: Bethesda, MD (USA). . IX, 526 + cd-rom pp. page(s): 97

External links
 Kiener L.C. (1834-1841). Spécies général et iconographie des coquilles vivantes. Vol. 9. Famille des Purpurifères. Deuxième partie. Genres Colombelle, (Columbella), Lamarck, pp. 1-63
  Reeve, L. A. (1853-1854). Monograph of the genus Nassa. In: Conchologia Iconica, or, illustrations of the shells of molluscous animals, vol. 9, pls 1-29 and unpaginated text. L. Reeve & Co., London.

Nassariidae
Gastropods described in 1841